Chiloglanis niger is a species of upside-down catfish endemic to Cameroon, where it occurs in the Niger River basin at Bamenda.  This species grows to a length of  SL.

References

External links 

niger
Freshwater fish of Africa
Fish of Cameroon
Endemic fauna of Cameroon
Fish described in 1989